Mohammed Mana (born 7 October 1950) was military Administrator of Plateau State between December 1993 and August 1996 during the military regime of General Sani Abacha. 
He was elected Senator for Adamawa North in 2007 on the People's Democratic Party (PDP) platform.

Background
Mana was born on 7 October 1950. He attended the Government College, Keffi. 
He obtained a diploma in Petroleum Technology from the US Army Quartermaster School in 1976.
In 1987, he obtained a diploma in Public Administration from Ahmadu Bello University, Zaria.

Military career
As Governor of Plateau State, in 1994, Lt. Col. Mohammed Mana set up a commission to look into the inter-ethnic conflict in Jos. 
The problems were due to friction between the Berom, Anaguta, and Afizere tribes on the one hand, and the Hausa-Fulani tribes on the other hand.
Riots had been triggered by Mana's appointment of a Hausa man as "caretaker Committee chairman" of Jos.

Mana retired from the military in June 1999 when President Olusegun Obasanjo decreed that all former military administrators must retire.

Civilian career
After becoming Senator in May 2007, Mana was appointed to committees on Selection, Power, Integration, and Cooperation.
He was also appointed deputy chief whip of the Senate.
He sponsored an Amendment Bill on Border Areas Development Commission, 2009 and a Bill for an Act on Tobacco Control, 2009.
Talking in March 2009 on the Electoral Reform report of the committee headed by Justice Mohammed Uwais, he recommended that the head of the Independent National Electoral Commission be appointed by the executive, but subject to judicial review.

After the February 2010 coup in Niger, the senate President David Mark asked Mohammed Mana and Senator John Shagaya of Plateau State to use their close ties with the new military leaders of Niger to urge them to embrace democracy.
In March 2010, Mana was appointed to a 20-man committee to find ways to permanently solve the Jos crisis, where there had been endemic violence between Muslims and Christians.

In the run-up to the 9 April 2011 national elections, Mana was a contender in the PDP primaries to again be Senatorial candidate for Adamawa North. However, he lost the nomination.
Mana filed an appeal against the selection of Umar Bindo Jibrilla as the candidate for Adamawa North. 
On 29 March 2011 a Federal High Court in Abuja dismissed the appeal as lacking in merit.
Mana appealed this ruling.
An early report of the Adamawa North Senatorial election results said that Bindo Jibrilla (PDP) defeated former governor Boni Haruna of the Action Congress of Nigeria (ACN), polling 75,112 votes to Haruna's 70,890 votes. The Congress for Progressive Change (CPC) candidate, Abba Mohammed, scored 22,866.
This result was also reported by the Independent National Electoral Commission (INEC) as of 16 April. 
However, by 23 April, the Nigeria Elections Coalition was reporting that Mana was the winning PDP candidate.

References

1950 births
Living people
Nigerian Muslims
Nigerian generals
Governors of Plateau State
Ahmadu Bello University alumni
Peoples Democratic Party members of the Senate (Nigeria)
21st-century Nigerian politicians
Adamawa State politicians
People from Adamawa State